Barbada de Barbades is the stage name of Sébastien Potvin, a Canadian drag queen most noted as one of the drag house mothers in the reality competition series Call Me Mother.

Career 
Potvin, the Black Canadian son of a Barbadian father and a Québécois mother, first began performing in drag when he entered the 2005 Star Search drag competition at Cabaret Mado. Although he was eliminated from the competition, he entered again in 2006 and won. He continued to perform regularly in drag at Cabaret Mado, becoming one of the club's regular headliners and winning Rita Baga's Mx Fierté pageant in 2017.

In 2017, Potvin participated in Ils de jour, elles de nuit, an Ici ARTV documentary series about drag queens, alongside Rita Baga, Gaby, Lady Boom Boom, Lady Pounana, and Tracy Trash.

Potvin, an elementary school music teacher by profession, has also been prominently associated with Drag Queen Story Hours in Montreal, including an annual special event at the Grande Bibliothèque of the Bibliothèque et Archives nationales du Québec, and is a frequent host of Montreal drag brunch events.

Since 2021, he has served as one of the drag house mothers in the first season of the reality competition series Call Me Mother. The series was the highest-rated original production in OutTV's history. Two days after the first season finale, OutTV announced the renewal of the series for a second season, slated to air in 2022.

In 2022, Potvin debuted as the host of Barbada, a children's series about music broadcast by Ici Radio-Canada Télé.

On September 18, 2022, Barbada de Barbades, Rita Baga and Mona de Grenoble presented an award at the Prix Gémeaux ceremony, reading the nominees before bringing out Gisèle Lullaby, the third season winner of Canada's Drag Race, to announce the winner.

References

Canadian drag queens
Black Canadian LGBT people
Canadian people of Barbadian descent
Participants in Canadian reality television series
Living people
Canadian music educators
Canadian children's entertainers
Canadian television hosts
LGBT in Quebec
21st-century Canadian LGBT people
Year of birth missing (living people)